Sinocyclocheilus robustus is an Asian freshwater species of ray-finned fish in the genus Sinocyclocheilus. It is benthopelagic and is found in China.

References 

robustus
Fish described in 1988